Mgodi (English: Excavation) is the fourth studio album by South African musician Zahara. It was released on October 13, 2017, through Warner Music. It features production from Mojalefa Thebe.

The album was a best-seller, attained gold certification in six hours and then achieving platinum status 20 hours after release by the Recording Industry of South Africa (RiSA).

At the 24th ceremony of South African Music Awards Mgodi was nominated for best Afro-pop Album category.

Background
Mgodi was inspired by Zahara's experiences with the intense public scrutiny that South Africa's tabloid journalists have subjected her to during her career. The album was also influenced by her departure from her former label, TS Records, in December 2016.

Zahara recorded the album in Johannesburg with producer Mjalefa "Mjakes" Thebe. Her three sisters make an appearance on the album on the track "God in the Valley".

Promotion 
Zahara further promoted Mgodi with her Africa All Star Music Festival  in August 2019, performing in the United States.

Track listing

Certifications and sales

References

2017 albums
Zahara (South African musician) albums
Xhosa-language albums